Bellevue, Mississippi is an unincorporated community in Lamar County, Mississippi.

In 2014, a group of Bellevue residents began the unsuccessful process of incorporating the community as a city. Incorporating the city would require approval of two-thirds of the voters in the proposed area. The proposed location of the City of Bellevue would be west of Hattiesburg, and would encompass the subdivisions of Bellegrass, Bent Creek, Bridgefield, Canebrake, Cumberland, Highpoint, and Sandstone, although "there is no official blueprint for the potential city".

Those advocating for the creation of the City of Bellevue state that their desire for incorporation is rooted in an aspiration to prevent Hattiesburg city limits from extending into the area and to standardize zoning laws in the name of "beauty and architectural continuity".

References

Unincorporated communities in Lamar County, Mississippi
Unincorporated communities in Mississippi